Eressa geographica is a moth of the family Erebidae. It was described by Edward Meyrick in 1886. It is found in Australia (the Northern Territory and Queensland).

The wingspan is about 20 mm. Adults have black wings with pale yellow translucent spots.

References

Eressa
Moths described in 1886